The 1969 Houston Astros season was a season in American baseball. The team finished in fifth place in the newly established National League West with a record of 81–81, twelve games behind the Atlanta Braves. It was also the first time in their history that the Astros did not finish below .500.

Offseason 
 October 14, 1968: Nate Colbert was drafted from the Astros by the San Diego Padres as the 18th pick in the 1968 MLB expansion draft.
 December 2, 1968: Bo Belinsky was drafted from the Astros by the St. Louis Cardinals in the 1968 rule 5 draft.
 December 4, 1968: Mike Cuellar, Enzo Hernández, and Elijah Johnson (minors) were traded by the Astros to the Baltimore Orioles for Curt Blefary and John Mason (minors).
 January 22, 1969: Rusty Staub was traded by the Astros to the Montreal Expos for Jesús Alou and Donn Clendenon. Clendenon refused to report to the Astros. The Expos sent Jack Billingham, Skip Guinn, and $100,000 to the Astros on April 8, 1969, as compensation.
 February 12, 1969: Byron Browne was purchased from the Astros by the St. Louis Cardinals.

Regular season 
 April 8: The Astros played against the San Diego Padres in the first ever game in Padres history.
 May 4, 1969: First baseman Curt Blefary participated in seven double plays.

The Astros season from August 26 to October 2 was featured in Jim Bouton's book, Ball Four. On September 19, Bouton struck out Tony Pérez of the Cincinnati Reds and made baseball history. With that strikeout, the pitching staff of the 1969 edition of the Houston Astros broke the then-National League record for most strikeouts in a season with 1,123 strikeouts. The team finished the year with 1,221 strikeouts, which stood as the National League record until 1996, when it was broken by the Atlanta Braves. They were the second team to have three pitchers with 200 strikeouts, with only the 1967 Minnesota Twins having accomplished the feat. Since then, only the 2013 Detroit Tigers have accomplished the feat.

Season standings

Record vs. opponents

Notable transactions 
 May 7, 1969: Oscar Zamora was signed as a free agent by the Astros.
 June 5, 1969: Pitcher J. R. Richard was selected by the Astros in the first round (second pick) of the 1969 Major League Baseball draft.
 August 24, 1969: Dooley Womack and Roric Harrison were traded by the Astros to the Seattle Pilots for pitcher Jim Bouton.

Roster

Player stats

Batting

Starters by position 
Note: Pos = Position; G = Games played; AB = At bats; H = Hits; Avg. = Batting average; HR = Home runs; RBI = Runs batted in

Other batters 
Note: G = Games played; AB = At bats; H = Hits; Avg. = Batting average; HR = Home runs; RBI = Runs batted in

Pitching

Starting pitchers 
Note: G = Games pitched; IP = Innings pitched; W = Wins; L = Losses; ERA = Earned run average; SO = Strikeouts

Other pitchers 
Note: G = Games pitched; IP = Innings pitched; W = Wins; L = Losses; ERA = Earned run average; SO = Strikeouts

Relief pitchers 
Note: G = Games pitched; W = Wins; L = Losses; SV = Saves; ERA = Earned run average; SO = Strikeouts

Awards and honors 
1969 MLB All-Star Game
 Larry Dierker
 Denis Menke

Farm system 

Savannah affiliation shared with Washington Senators

References

External links
1969 Houston Astros season at Baseball Reference

Houston Astros seasons
Houston Astros season
Houston Astro